The 1999 Oceania Youth Athletics Championships were held in Santa Rita, Guam, between July 2–3, 1999.
A total of 30 events were contested, 15 by boys and 15 by girls.

Medal summary
Complete results can be found on the Athletics Weekly, and on the World Junior Athletics History webpages.

Boys under 18 (Youth)

Girls under 18 (Youth)

Medal table (unofficial)

Participation (unofficial)
An unofficial count yields the number of about 116 athletes from 17 countries:

 (4)
 (10)
 (7)
 (7)
 (19)
 (5)
 (5)
 (1)
 (12)
 (5)
 (6)
 (4)
 (8)
 (3)
 (5)
/ (9)
 (6)

References

Oceania Youth Athletics Championships
Athletics in Guam
Oceanian U18 Championships
1999 in Guamanian sports
International sports competitions hosted by Guam
1999 in youth sport
July 1999 sports events in Oceania